United Nations Security Council resolution 1442, adopted unanimously on 25 November 2002, after reaffirming all resolutions on the situation in Cyprus, particularly Resolution 1251 (1999), the council extended the mandate of the United Nations Peacekeeping Force in Cyprus (UNFICYP) for an additional six months until 15 June 2003.

The security council noted the call within the Secretary-General Kofi Annan's report for the authorities in Cyprus and Northern Cyprus to urgently address the humanitarian situation concerning missing persons. It also welcomed efforts to sensitise United Nations peacekeeping personnel towards the prevention and control of HIV/AIDS and other diseases.

Extending UNFICYP's mandate, the resolution requested the secretary-general to report to the council by 1 June 2003 on the implementation of the current resolution. It also urged the Turkish Cypriot side to end restrictions imposed on 30 June 2000 on UNIFCYP operations and to restore the military status quo at Strovilia.

See also
 Annan Plan for Cyprus
 Cyprus dispute
 List of United Nations Security Council Resolutions 1401 to 1500 (2002–2003)
 United Nations Buffer Zone in Cyprus
 Turkish invasion of Cyprus

References

External links
 
Text of the Resolution at undocs.org

 1442
 1442
2002 in Cyprus
2000s in Cypriot politics
November 2002 events